Matanuska may refer to:
Matanuska Formation, the northern Chugach Mountains, Alaska
Matanuska Glacier, in the Chugach Mountains, Alaska
Matanuska River, in Alaska
Matanuska-Susitna Borough, Alaska, in Alaska
Matanuska-Susitna Valley, in Alaska
Matanuska Valley Colony in Alaska
M/V Matanuska, a vessel in the Alaska Marine Highway System
 Matanuska (crater), an impact crater on the minor planet 253 Mathilde